The Complete Collection of Russian Chronicles (abbr. PSRL) is a series of published volumes aimed at collecting all medieval East Slavic chronicles, with various editions published in Imperial Russia, the Soviet Union, and Russian Federation. The project is ongoing and far from finished.

The chronicles were assembled by the Archaeographical Expedition of the Russian Academy of Sciences (starting in 1828). They were prepared for publication by the Archaeographical Commission, established in 1834 as part of the Ministry of National Enlightenment. The first volumes were published by a publisher "Typography of Edward Prats". The commission was charged to publish the collection on February 18, 1837.

The first ten volumes appeared between 1841 and 1863. New volumes have been brought forth piecemeal throughout the 20th and early 21st centuries. Some of the older volumes have also been reprinted, especially after 1997.

List of published volumes

Typography of Edward Prats
 Volume 1. Laurentian and Trinitarian Codices. Saint Petersburg, 1846
 Volume 2. Hypatian Codex. Saint Petersburg, 1843 (included also Hustynian Chronicle)
 Volume 3. Novgorodian Codex. Saint Petersburg, 1841
 Volume 4. Chronicles of Novgorod and Pskov. Saint Petersburg, 1848
 Volume 5. Chronicles of Pskov and Sophia. Saint Petersburg, 1851
 Volume 6. Sofia Chronicle. Saint Petersburg, 1853
 Volume 7. Chronicle of Resurrection List. Saint Petersburg, 1856
 Volume 8. Continuation of the Resurrection List Chronicle. Saint Petersburg, 1859
 Volume 9. Chronicles collection named as Patriarchal or Nikon Chronicle. Saint Petersburg, 1862
 Number of indices (1868-1907)

In 1871-72 the first two volumes were republished as the second editions.

Typography of Skorokhodov and Typography of Aleksandrov

External links 
 Full Collection of Russian Chronicles 

East Slavic chronicles
History of Kievan Rus'
Lithuanian chronicles